Plaza San Pedro is a shopping mall in Monterrey, Mexico, located in San Pedro Garza García on the Humberto Lobo Avenue almost in front of the Puente Atirantado and a block from Calzada del Valle/Calzada San Pedro. The shopping mall takes its name from the municipality it resides in. It has 150 shops.

Attractions 
Restaurants, shops, indoor ice skating rink, banks and various service centers
Adjacent to Soriana San Pedro

External links 
 Plaza San Pedro

Shopping malls in Monterrey